KKTY (1470 AM) is a radio station broadcasting a classic hits format. Licensed to Douglas, Wyoming, United States.  The station is owned by Douglas Broadcasting, Inc. and features programming from NBC Radio and Westwood One. KKTY also broadcasts on translator K227BU at 93.3 FM in the Douglas area.

KKTY broadcasts University of Wyoming Cowboys football and Cowboys and Cowgirls basketball, Denver Broncos football and Colorado Rockies baseball.

History
The station signed on as KWIV in June 1957. KWIV originally broadcast as a 250-watt daytimer on 1050AM. In the 1970s, KWIV moved from 1050 to 1470, allowing Casper's KTWO to move from 1470 to 1030. The move to 1470AM allowed KWIV to raise its daytime power to 1,000 watts, and for the first time, broadcast at night with 500 watts. The station was assigned the call sign KKTY on May 1, 1992. September 1, 1992, the station changed its call sign to KWOG and on December 2, 1993, the station reverted to KKTY.

References

External links

KTY
Radio stations established in 1957
Classic hits radio stations in the United States
Douglas, Wyoming
Converse County, Wyoming